4-Phenyl-4-(1-piperidinyl)cyclohexanol, also known as PPC, is an organic chemical which is a metabolite of phencyclidine (PCP).  It can be detected in the hair of PCP users.

PPC has been shown to cause increases in locomotor activity in lab mice.

See also
 PCHP, another PCP metabolite

References

Arylcyclohexylamines
Secondary alcohols
1-Piperidinyl compounds
Recreational drug metabolites